Alexandria Ocasio-Cortez (born October 13, 1989), also known by her initials AOC, is an American politician and activist. She has served as the U.S. representative for New York's 14th congressional district since 2019, as a member of the Democratic Party. The district includes the eastern part of the Bronx, portions of north-central Queens, and Rikers Island in New York City.

On June 26, 2018, Ocasio-Cortez drew national recognition when she won the Democratic Party's primary election for New York's 14th congressional district. She defeated Democratic Caucus Chair Joe Crowley, a 10-term incumbent, in what was widely seen as the biggest upset victory in the 2018 midterm election primaries. She easily won the November general election, defeating Republican Anthony Pappas. She was reelected in the 2020 and 2022 elections.

Taking office at age 29, Ocasio-Cortez is the youngest woman ever to serve in the United States Congress. She has been noted for her substantial social media presence relative to her fellow members of Congress. Ocasio-Cortez attended Boston University, where she double-majored in international relations and economics, graduating cum laude. She was previously an activist and worked as a waitress and bartender before running for Congress in 2018.

Alongside Rashida Tlaib, Ocasio-Cortez was the first female member of the Democratic Socialists of America elected to serve in Congress. She advocates a progressive platform that includes support for workplace democracy, Medicare for All, tuition-free public college, a federal jobs guarantee, a Green New Deal, and abolishing the U.S. Immigration and Customs Enforcement (ICE).

Early life
Ocasio-Cortez was born in the New York City borough of the Bronx on October 13, 1989, the daughter of Sergio Ocasio-Roman and Blanca Ocasio-Cortez. She has a younger brother named Gabriel. Her father was born in the Bronx to a Puerto Rican family and became an architect; her mother was born in Puerto Rico. Ocasio-Cortez lived with her family in an apartment in the Bronx neighborhood of Parkchester until she was five, when the family moved to a house in suburban Yorktown Heights.

Ocasio-Cortez attended Yorktown High School, graduating in 2007. In high school and college, Ocasio-Cortez went by the name of "Sandy Ocasio". She came in second in the microbiology category of the Intel International Science and Engineering Fair in 2007 with a research project on the effect of antioxidants on the lifespan of the nematode Caenorhabditis elegans. In a show of appreciation for her efforts, the MIT Lincoln Laboratory named a small asteroid after her: 23238 Ocasio-Cortez. In high school, she took part in the National Hispanic Institute's Lorenzo de Zavala (LDZ) Youth Legislative Session. She later became the LDZ Secretary of State while she attended Boston University. Ocasio-Cortez had a John F. Lopez Fellowship.

After graduating from high school, Ocasio-Cortez enrolled at Boston University. Her father died of lung cancer in 2008 during her second year, and Ocasio-Cortez became involved in a lengthy probate battle to settle his estate. She has said that the experience helped her learn "first-hand how attorneys appointed by the court to administer an estate can enrich themselves at the expense of the families struggling to make sense of the bureaucracy". During college, Ocasio-Cortez served as an intern for U.S. senator Ted Kennedy in his section on foreign affairs and  immigration issues. She recalled, "I was the only Spanish speaker, and as a result, as basically a kida 19-, 20-year-old kidwhenever a frantic call would come into the office because someone is looking for their husband because they have been snatched off the street by ICE, I was the one that had to pick up that phone. I was the one that had to help that person navigate that system." Ocasio-Cortez graduated cum laude from Boston University in 2011 with a Bachelor of Arts degree in both international relations and economics.

Early career
After college, Ocasio-Cortez moved back to the Bronx and took a job as a bartender and waitress to help her mother—a house cleaner and school bus driver—fight foreclosure of their home. She later launched Brook Avenue Press, a now-defunct publishing firm for books that portrayed the Bronx in a positive light. Ocasio-Cortez also worked for the nonprofit National Hispanic Institute.

During the 2016 primary, Ocasio-Cortez worked as an organizer for Bernie Sanders's presidential campaign. After the general election, she traveled across America by car, visiting places such as Flint, Michigan, and Standing Rock Indian Reservation in North Dakota, and speaking to people affected by the Flint water crisis and the Dakota Access Pipeline. In an interview she recalled her December 2016 visit to Standing Rock as a tipping point, saying that before that, she had believed that the only way to run for office effectively was to have access to wealth, social influence, and power. But her visit to North Dakota, where she saw others "putting their whole lives and everything that they had on the line for the protection of their community", inspired her to begin to work for her own community. One day after she visited North Dakota, she got a phone call from Brand New Congress, which was recruiting progressive candidates (her brother had nominated her soon after Election Day 2016). She has credited Jabari Brisport's unsuccessful City Council campaign with restoring her belief in electoral politics, in running as a socialist candidate, and in Democratic Socialists of America as an organization.

U.S. House of Representatives

Elections

2018

Ocasio-Cortez began her campaign in April 2017 while waiting tables and tending bar at Flats Fix, a taqueria in New York City's Union Square. "For 80 percent of this campaign, I operated out of a paper grocery bag hidden behind that bar", she told Bon Appétit. She was the first person since 2004 to challenge Joe Crowley, the Democratic Caucus Chair, in the primary. She faced a financial disadvantage, saying, "You can't really beat big money with more money. You have to beat them with a totally different game." Ocasio-Cortez's campaign undertook grassroots mobilization and did not take donations from corporations. Her campaign posters' designs were said to have taken inspiration from "revolutionary posters and visuals from the past".

The candidates' only face-to-face encounter during the campaign occurred on a local political talk show, Inside City Hall, on June 15. The format was a joint interview conducted by Errol Louis, which NY1 characterized as a debate. A debate in the Bronx was scheduled for June 18, but Crowley did not participate. He sent former New York City Council member Annabel Palma in his place.

Endorsements
Ocasio-Cortez was endorsed by progressive and civil rights organizations such as MoveOn and Democracy for America. 
Then-Governor Cuomo endorsed Crowley, as did both of New York's U.S. senators, Chuck Schumer and Kirsten Gillibrand, as well as then-New York City Mayor Bill de Blasio, multiple U.S. representatives, various local elected officials and trade unions, and groups such as the Sierra Club, Planned Parenthood, the Working Families Party, NARAL Pro-Choice America, and Moms Demand Action for Gun Sense in America, among others. California representative Ro Khanna, a Justice Democrat like Ocasio-Cortez, initially endorsed Crowley but later endorsed Ocasio-Cortez in an unusual dual endorsement.

Primary election

Ocasio-Cortez received 57.13% of the vote (15,897) to Crowley's 42.5% (11,761), defeating the 10-term incumbent by almost 15 percentage points on June 26, 2018. The result shocked many political commentators and analysts and immediately garnered nationwide attention. Many news sources, including Time, CNN, The New York Times, and The Guardian mentioned how the win completely defied their predictions and expectations. She was outspent by a margin of 18 to1 ($1.5million to $83,000) but won the endorsement of some influential groups on the party's left. Merriam-Webster reported that searches for the word socialism spiked 1,500% after her victory. Crowley conceded defeat on election night, but did not telephone Ocasio-Cortez that night to congratulate her, fueling short-lived speculation that he intended to run against her in the general election.

Bernie Sanders and Noam Chomsky congratulated her. Several commentators noted the similarities between Ocasio-Cortez's victory over Crowley and Dave Brat's Tea Party movement-supported 2014 victory over House Majority Leader Eric Cantor in the Republican primary for Virginia's 7th congressional district. Like Crowley, Cantor was a high-ranking member in his party's caucus. After her primary win, Ocasio-Cortez endorsed several progressive primary challengers to Democratic incumbents nationwide, capitalizing on her fame and spending her political capital in a manner unusual even for unexpected primary winners.

Without campaigning for it, Ocasio-Cortez won the Reform Party primary as a write-in candidate in a neighboring congressional district, New York's 15th, with a total vote count of nine, highest among all 22 write-in candidates. She declined the nomination.

General election
Ocasio-Cortez faced Republican nominee Anthony Pappas in the November 6 general election. Pappas, an economics professor, did not actively campaign. The 14th district has a Cook Partisan Voting Index of D+29, making it New York City's sixth-most Democratic district, with registered Democrats outnumbering Republicans almost six to one.

Ocasio-Cortez was endorsed by various politically progressive organizations and figures, including former president Barack Obama and U.S. senator Bernie Sanders. She spoke at the Netroots Nation conference in August 2018, and was called "the undisputed star of the convention".

Crowley remained on the ballot as the nominee of the Working Families Party (WFP) and the Women's Equality Party (WEP). Neither he nor the WFP party actively campaigned, both having endorsed Ocasio-Cortez after the Democratic primary. Ocasio-Cortez called the WEP, which Governor Cuomo created ahead of the 2014 New York gubernatorial election, a cynical, centrist group that endorsed male incumbents over female challengers like her and Cynthia Nixon. Former Connecticut senator Joe Lieberman, who won reelection in 2006 on a third-party line after losing the Democratic Primary in 2006, penned a July 17 column in the Wall Street Journal expressing hope that Crowley would actively campaign on the WFP ballot line. WFP Executive Director Dan Cantor wrote an endorsement of, and apology to, Ocasio-Cortez for the New York Daily News; he asked voters not to vote for Crowley if his name remained on the general election ballot.

Ocasio-Cortez won the election with 78% of the vote (110,318) to Pappas's 14% (17,762). Crowley, on the WFP and WEP lines, received 9,348 votes (6.6%). Her election was part of a broader Democratic victory in the 2018 midterm elections, as the party gained control of the House by picking up 41 seats. Saikat Chakrabarti, who had been her campaign co-chair, became chief of staff for her congressional office. Co-creator of two progressive political action committees, he has been called a significant political presence. His departure in 2019 drew considerable speculation as to whether Ocasio-Cortez was trying to implement a more moderate strategy.

Media coverage
The first media network to give Ocasio-Cortez a platform and extensively cover her campaign and policies was The Young Turks, a left-wing online news program. After her primary win, she quickly garnered nationwide media attention, including numerous articles and TV talk-show appearances. She also drew a great deal of media attention when she and Sanders campaigned for James Thompson in Kansas in July 2018. A rally in Wichita had to be moved from a theater with a capacity of 1,500 when far more people said they would attend. The event drew 4,000 people, with some seated on the floor. In The New Yorker, Benjamin Wallace-Wells wrote that while Sanders remained "the de-facto leader of an increasingly popular left, [he is unable to] do things that do not come naturally to him, like supply hope." Wallace-Wells suggested that Ocasio-Cortez had made Sanders's task easier, as he could point to her success to show that ideas "once considered to be radical are now part of the mainstream".

Until she defeated incumbent Joe Crowley in the 2018 Democratic primary, Ocasio-Cortez received little coverage on most traditional news media outlets. Jimmy Dore interviewed her when she first announced her candidacy in June 2017. After her primary win, Brian Stelter wrote that progressive-media outlets, such as The Young Turks and The Intercept, "saw the Ocasio-Cortez upset coming" in advance. Margaret Sullivan wrote in The Washington Post that traditional metrics of measuring a campaign's viability, like total fundraising, were contributing to a "media failure" and that "they need to get closer to what voters are thinking and feeling: their anger and resentment, their disenfranchisement from the centers of power, their pocketbook concerns."

Ocasio-Cortez's campaign was featured on the cover of the June 2018 edition of The Indypendent, a free New York City-based monthly newspaper. In a tweet she hailed the cover appearance on "NYC's classic monthly" as an important breakthrough for her campaign. Otherwise Ocasio-Cortez was barely mentioned in print until her primary win.

Ocasio-Cortez was one of the subjects of the 2018 Michael Moore documentary Fahrenheit 11/9; it chronicled her primary campaign.

In an attempt to embarrass Ocasio-Cortez just before she took office, Twitter user "AnonymousQ" shared a video dating to Ocasio-Cortez's college years: a Boston University student-produced dance video in which she briefly appeared. Many social media users came to her defense, inspiring memes and a Twitter account syncing the footage to songs like "Mambo No. 5" and "Gangnam Style". Ocasio-Cortez responded by posting a video of herself dancing to Edwin Starr's "War" outside her congressional office.

Elizabeth Warren wrote the entry on Ocasio-Cortez for 2019's Time 100. The documentary Knock Down the House, directed by Rachel Lears, which focuses on four female Democrats in the 2018 United States elections who were not career politicians—Ocasio-Cortez, Amy Vilela, Cori Bush and Paula Jean Swearengin—premiered at the 2019 Sundance Film Festival. Ocasio-Cortez was the only one of the women featured in the film to win. It was released by Netflix on May 1, 2019. Ocasio-Cortez also appeared in Lears's 2022 film To the End, which focuses on the effects of climate change. The film debuted at the 2022 Sundance Film Festival and was presented at the Tribeca Film Festival in June 2022.

2020

Michelle Caruso-Cabrera challenged Ocasio-Cortez in the 2020 Democratic primary. After Ocasio-Cortez won the nomination, Caruso-Cabrera reorganized and ran in the general election as the Serve America Movement nominee. Ocasio-Cortez's Republican challengers in the general election included nominee John Cummings, a former police officer, and Antoine Tucker, a write-in candidate.

The American Prospect wrote in October 2020 that Ocasio-Cortez was "spending the 2020 campaign running workshops" for constituents on workplace organizing, fighting eviction, and organizing collective childcare. They noted that Ocasio-Cortez was often not featured in the streamed workshops, saying the "strategy decentralizes the candidate from her own campaign."

On October 20, 2020, Ocasio-Cortez hosted a Twitch stream of the social deduction game Among Us, with fellow congresswoman Ilhan Omar, and many established streamers such as Pokimane, Hasan Piker, DrLupo, and mxmtoon. The stream peaked with over 400,000 viewers and, according to The Guardian Joshua Rivera, succeeded in humanizing her. Ocasio-Cortez again streamed Among Us on Twitch on November 27, 2020, with Hasan Piker, xQc, ContraPoints and Canadian MP Jagmeet Singh to raise money for food pantries, eviction defense legal aid, and community support organizations to assist those suffering economic hardship during the COVID-19 pandemic. The stream raised $200,000 and Ocasio-Cortez wrote, "This is going to make such a difference for those who need it most right now."

2022

Ocasio-Cortez was unopposed in the Democratic primary. She defeated Republican Tina Forte and Conservative Party nominee Desi Cuellar in the general election.

Tenure

Taking office at age 29, Ocasio-Cortez is the youngest woman ever to serve in the United States Congress, and also the youngest member of the 116th Congress.

When the 116th Congress convened on January 3, 2019, Ocasio-Cortez entered with no seniority but with a large social media presence. Axios credited her with "as much social media clout as her fellow freshman Democrats combined". , she has 12million Twitter followers, up from 1.4 million in November 2018 and surpassing Nancy Pelosi. She has 8.9 million Instagram followers as of January 2019 and 500,000 followers on Facebook as of February 2019. Her colleagues appointed her to teach them social media lessons upon her arrival in Congress. In early July 2019 two lawsuits were filed against her for blocking Joey Salads and Dov Hikind on Twitter in light of the Second Circuit Court of Appeals ruling that it was a violation of the First Amendment for President Trump to block people on Twitter. On November 4, 2019, it was announced that they settled the lawsuit with Ocasio-Cortez issuing a statement apologizing for the Twitter block.

In a 2019 interview, Ocasio-Cortez said she had stopped using her private Facebook account and was minimizing her usage of all social media accounts and platforms, calling them a "public health risk".

Arrival
In November 2018, on the first day of congressional orientation, Ocasio-Cortez participated in a climate change protest outside the office of House Minority Leader Nancy Pelosi. Also that month, she backed Pelosi's bid to be Speaker of the House once the Democratic Party reclaimed the majority on the condition that Pelosi "remains the most progressive candidate for speaker".

During the orientation for new members hosted by the John F. Kennedy School of Government, Ocasio-Cortez wrote on Twitter in December 2018 about the influence of corporate interests by sponsors such as the American Enterprise Institute and the Center for Strategic and International Studies: "Lobbyists are here. Goldman Sachs is here. Where's labor? Activists? Frontline community leaders?"

When Ocasio-Cortez made her first speech on the floor of Congress in January 2019, C-SPAN tweeted the video. Within 12 hours, the video of her four-minute speech set the record as C-SPAN's most-watched Twitter video by a member of the House of Representatives.

Hearings
In February 2019, speaking at a Congressional hearing with a panel of representatives from campaign finance watchdog groups, Ocasio-Cortez questioned the panel about ethics regulations as they apply to both the president and members of Congress. She asserted that no regulations prevent lawmakers "from being bought off by wealthy corporations". With more than 37.5 million views, the clip became the most-watched political video posted on Twitter.

When President Donald Trump's former lawyer Michael Cohen appeared before the Oversight Committee in February 2019, Ocasio-Cortez asked him whether Trump had inflated property values for bank or insurance purposes and inquired where to get more information on the subject. Cohen's reply implied that Trump may have committed tax and bank fraud in his personal and business tax returns, financial statements and real-estate filings. The president of the American Constitution Society named Ocasio-Cortez as the committee member best at obtaining specific information from Cohen about Trump's "shady practices, along with a road map for how to find out more". New York Times columnist David Brooks praised her skill in questioning Cohen. The exchange between Ocasio-Cortez and Cohen prompted an investigation by New York Attorney General Letitia James, who referred to it in August 2020 when filing legal action to compel Trump's companies to comply with subpoenas about financial information, and to compel his son Eric Trump to testify.

Media coverage

According to reports in March 2019, Ocasio-Cortez continued to receive media coverage early in her congressional tenure on par with that of 2020 presidential candidates and was considered "one of the faces of the Democratic party" and one of the most talked-about politicians in the United States. Between July8 and 14, 2019, she drew more social media attention than the Democratic presidential candidates. Tracking company NewsWhip found that interactions with news articles on Ocasio-Cortez numbered 4.8 million, while no Democratic presidential candidate got more than 1.2 million. David Bauder of the Associated Press wrote that Trump's supporters were thus having "some success" in having "Ocasio-Cortez be top of mind when people think of" the Democratic Party.

According to a Media Matters for America study, Ocasio-Cortez has been intensely discussed on sister television channels Fox News and Fox Business, being mentioned every day from February 25 to April 7, 2019, for a total of 3,181 mentions in 42 days (an average of around 75 per day). The Guardian David Smith wrote that this is evidence that Fox is "obsessed by Ocasio-Cortez, portraying her as a radical socialist who threatens the American way of life". Brian Stelter of CNN Business found that between January to July 2019, she had nearly three times as many mentions on Fox News as on CNN and MSNBC, and seven times the coverage of James Clyburn, a Democratic leader in the House of Representatives. Stelter wrote that the attention Ocasio-Cortez is receiving has caused "the perception, particularly on the right, that her positions and policies are representative of the Democratic Party as a whole". In a CBS News and YouGov poll of almost 2,100 American adults conducted from July 17 to 19, it was found that Republican respondents were more aware of Ocasio-Cortez than Democratic respondents. She had very unfavorable ratings among Republican respondents and favorable ratings among Democratic respondents.

In March 2019, PolitiFact reported that Ocasio-Cortez is "one of the most targeted politicians for hoax claims, despite the fact that she just entered Congress as a freshman". Fake quotes attributed to her, fake photos of her, and false rumors about her have spread on social media. Some of these have originated from 4chan and r/The_Donald. By July 2019, the fake material included attributing things Trump said to Ocasio-Cortez, such as "I have a very good brain and I've said lots of things." On July 18, 2019, Charlie Rispoli, a police officer from Gretna, posted on Facebook an apparent threat to shoot Ocasio-Cortez, calling her a "vile idiot" who "needs a round, and I don't mean the kind she used to serve" as a bartender. Rispoli posted the comment in response to a fake news article that falsely quoted Ocasio-Cortez as saying "We pay soldiers too much". A photo from the article also had the label "satire". Rispoli was fired for his post and his Facebook account was deleted.

Ocasio-Cortez is known to wear red lipstick, usually by the American makeup brand Stila Cosmetics in the shade "Beso", as a style trait of Latina women from the Bronx. In a skincare tutorial for Vogue, she explained that beauty and femininity are important to her because these things are often used against women in politics and society, and that self-love is like a "mini protest" against misogynistic critiques.

Met Gala appearance 

Ocasio-Cortez attended the 2021 Met Gala, which had the theme "In America: a Lexicon of Fashion". The Met Gala is an annual fundraiser for the Metropolitan Museum of Art that is overseen by Vogue editor-in-chief Anna Wintour, who selects every invitee and designer pairing. Ocasio-Cortez wore an organza gown emblazoned with the phrase "Tax the Rich". As an elected official in New York City she was considered a guest of the museum, and as such did not have to buy a ticket, which costs at least $35,000. The dress's designer, Aurora James, also invited her boyfriend Benjamin Bronfman, the son of a billionaire. Critics, both conservative and liberal, rebuked Ocasio-Cortez for attending an event where guests were not required to wear masks but event staff were and for attending an event known for its opulent display of wealth and social status. She responded that they were using a sexist double standard and that she "punctured the fourth wall of excess and spectacle." James also believed that the extremely wealthy people in attendance needed to see the message in person.

In September 2021, the American Accountability Foundation filed an ethics complaint against Ocasio-Cortez for attending the Met Gala. The AAF claimed that her attendance amounted to accepting an illegal gift since her estimated $35,000 ticket was paid for by Condé Nast, a for-profit company, not a charity. The event itself is a charitable fundraiser.

"The Squad"

Ocasio-Cortez is a member of an informal group of progressive members of Congress called "The Squad," along with Ilhan Omar, Ayanna Pressley, Rashida Tlaib, Cori Bush and Jamaal Bowman. On July 14, 2019, Trump attacked the Squad (which had only four members at the time) in a tweet, saying that they should "go back and help fix" the countries they came from rather than criticize the American government. He continued to make similar comments over the next several days, even though three of the women, including Ocasio-Cortez, were born in the United States. Ocasio-Cortez responded in a tweet that "the President's words [yesterday], telling four American Congresswomen of color 'go back to your own country' is hallmark language of white supremacists." She later added, "We don't leave the things that we love, and when we love this country, what that means is that we propose the solutions to fix it." Days later, Trump falsely asserted that Ocasio-Cortez called "our country and our people 'garbage'"; she had actually said that Americans should not be content with moderate policies that are "10% better from garbage". Trump also falsely claimed that Ocasio-Cortez said "illegal immigrants are more American" than Americans who tried to keep them out; she actually said that "women and children on that border that are trying to seek refuge and opportunity" in America "are acting more American" than those who tried to keep them out.

Green New Deal

Ocasio-Cortez submitted her first piece of legislation, the Green New Deal, to the House on February 7, 2019. She and Senator Ed Markey released a joint non-binding resolution laying out the main elements of a 10-year "economic mobilization" that would phase out fossil fuel use and overhaul the nation's infrastructure. Their plan called for implementing the "social cost of carbon" that was part of the Obama administration's plans to address climate change. In the process it aimed to create jobs and boost the economy. According to CNBC, an initial outline the Green New Deal called for "completely ditching fossil fuels, upgrading or replacing 'every building' in the country and 'totally overhaul[ing] transportation' to the point where 'air travel stops becoming necessary'". The outline set a goal of having the U.S. "creating 'net zero' greenhouse gases in 10 years. Why 'net zero'? The lawmakers explained: 'We set a goal to get to net-zero, rather than zero emissions, in 10 years because we aren't sure that we'll be able to fully get rid of farting cows and airplanes that fast.'" Activist groups such as Greenpeace and the Sunrise Movement came out in favor of the plan. No Republican lawmakers voiced support. The plan gained support from some Democratic senators, including Elizabeth Warren, Bernie Sanders and Cory Booker; other Democrats, such as Senator Dianne Feinstein and House speaker Nancy Pelosi, dismissed the proposal (Pelosi has referred to it as "the green dream, or whatever they call it").

In what Democrats called a "stunt", Senate Republicans called for an early vote on the Green New Deal on March 26 without allowing discussion or expert testimony. Markey said Republicans were trying to "make a mockery" of the Green New Deal debate and called the vote a "sham". In protest, Senate Democrats voted "present" or against the bill, resulting in a 57–0 defeat on the Senate floor. In March 2019, a group of UK activists proposed that the Labour Party adopt a similar plan, "Labour for a Green New Deal". The group said it was inspired by the Sunrise Movement and the work Ocasio-Cortez has done in the US.

Online harassment from Paul Gosar

In November 2021, Representative Paul Gosar posted a version of the title sequence of the anime series Attack on Titan on social media that he had edited with the faces of Ocasio-Cortez, Joe Biden, and himself superimposed on the show's characters, depicting Gosar attacking them with swords and killing Ocasio-Cortez. Speaker Nancy Pelosi called for law enforcement and the House Ethics Committee to investigate it as a threat.

Pelosi opened discussion on the House floor saying that Gosar's actions demanded a response. "We cannot have members joking about murdering each other or threatening the president of the United States. This is both an indictment of our elected officials and an insult to the institution of the House of Representatives. It's not just about us as members of Congress. It is a danger that it represents to everyone in the country."

When Republican House members refused to condemn the video, Ocasio-Cortez responded that she believed the video was "part of a pattern that normalizes violence", adding, "I believe this is a part of a concerted strategy and I think it's very important for us to draw a strict line a strong line for material consequence". She gave a six-minute floor speech, saying, "This is not about me. This is not about Representative Gosar. This is about what we're willing to accept." The House voted to censure Gosar, mostly along party lines. The last time the House censured a lawmaker was in 2010.

Verbal harassment from Ted Yoho 

On July 20, 2020, Republican representatives Ted Yoho and Roger Williams accosted Ocasio-Cortez on the steps of the Capitol, where Yoho (as overheard by a journalist) called her "disgusting" and told her, "You are out of your freaking mind" for recently suggesting that poverty and unemployment were driving a spike in crime in New York City during the COVID-19 pandemic amid her ongoing advocacy for cutting police budgets. Ocasio-Cortez told Yoho he was being "rude". As Ocasio-Cortez walked away from Yoho into the Capitol, Yoho called her a "fucking bitch". Yoho addressed the matter on the House floor and, without naming Ocasio-Cortez, apologized for the "abrupt manner of the conversation" with her, claiming that "offensive name calling, words attributed to me by the press, were never spoken to my colleagues", and concluding: "I cannot apologize for my passion". Ocasio-Cortez responded with a speech stating that the incident was emblematic of a "culture ... accepting of violence and violent language against women ... In using that language, in front of the press, he gave permission to use that language against his wife, his daughters, women in his community, and I am here to stand up to say that is not acceptable."

Reaction to Andrew Cuomo scandals 
 
In April 2020, Ocasio-Cortez was one of 77 representatives to call for public reports of data regarding COVID-19 cases in nursing homes and long-term care facilities. In March 2021, Ocasio-Cortez and Representative Jamaal Bowman called for New York governor Andrew Cuomo to resign, citing the sexual misconduct allegations against him, as well as the New York COVID-19 nursing home scandal about the Cuomo administration's reported undercounting of COVID-19 nursing home deaths.

January 6 Capitol attack 

 
In a nearly 90-minute Instagram Live video made in February 2021, Ocasio-Cortez said that she had previously experienced sexual assault, and recounted her experience of fear during the 2021 storming of the United States Capitol, when she was in her office (in the Cannon House Office Building). She said she had hidden in her office bathroom before being startled by a Capitol Police officer who entered her office suite and shouted "Where is she?" before ordering her and her staff to evacuate to a different House Office Building. Ocasio-Cortez said the officer did not self-identify, and said she first believed the officer's voice was that of an attacker. She described sheltering in place in Representative Katie Porter's office and preparing for what she believed would be an assault by rioters on their offices. She said, "I had a very close encounter where I thought I was going to die."

Other issues 
Ocasio-Cortez reacted to the 2021 Texas power crisis by organizing a fundraiser to provide food, water, and shelter to affected Texans. The fundraiser, which began on February 18, raised $2million in its first day and $5million by February 21. The money went to organizations such as the Houston Food Bank and the North Texas Food Bank. Ocasio-Cortez also traveled to Houston to help volunteers with recovery.

On April 15, 2021, Ocasio-Cortez and three other senators called a press conference to announce a bill that they had introduced to implement postal banking pilot programs in rural and low-income urban neighborhoods where millions of households cannot access or afford standard banking services. Ocasio-Cortez described the families she sees in her urban community who need to rely on check cashing companies that charge exorbitant interest rates due to the absence of mainstream banks. "They'll show up to a check cashing place and imagine cashing your stimulus check...and having 10 to 20% of that check taken away from you."

On November 5, 2021, Ocasio-Cortez was one of six House Democrats to break with their party and vote against the Infrastructure Investment and Jobs Act, as it was decoupled from the social safety net provisions in the Build Back Better Act.

In September 2022, in an interview for a feature article in GQ, Ocasio-Cortez was asked about her future and running for president. She said, "I hold two contradictory things [in mind] at the same time. One is just the relentless belief that anything is possible. But at the same time, my experience here has given me a front-row seat to how deeply and unconsciously, as well as consciously, so many people in this country hate women. And they hate women of color. People ask me questions about the future. And realistically, I can't even tell you if I'm going to be alive in September [of 2022]. And that weighs very heavily on me. And it's not just the right wing. Misogyny transcends political ideology: left, right, center."

Committee assignments
Committee on Oversight and Accountability (Vice Ranking Member, 2023-present)
Subcommittee on Health Care and Financial Services
Subcommittee on National Security, the Border, and Foreign Affairs
Committee on Natural Resources
Subcommittee on Energy and Mineral Resources (Ranking Member, 2023-present)

Caucus memberships
Congressional Progressive Caucus
 House Pro-Choice Caucus

Political positions

Ocasio-Cortez is a member of the Democratic Socialists of America and embraces the democratic socialist label as part of her political identity. In an interview on NBC's Meet the Press, she described democratic socialism as "part of what I am. It's not all of what I am. And I think that that's a very important distinction." In response to a question about democratic socialism ultimately calling for an end to capitalism during a Firing Line interview on PBS, she answered: "Ultimately, we are marching towards progress on this issue. I do think that we are going to see an evolution in our economic system of an unprecedented degree, and it's hard to say what direction that that takes." Later at a conference she said "To me, capitalism is irredeemable."

Ocasio-Cortez supports progressive policies such as single-payer Medicare for All, tuition-free public college and trade school, a federal job guarantee, the cancellation of all $1.6trillion of outstanding student debt, guaranteed family leave, abolishing U.S. Immigration and Customs Enforcement, ending the privatization of prisons, enacting gun-control policies, and energy policy relying on 100% renewables. She told Anderson Cooper that she favors policies that "most closely resemble what we see in the UK, in Norway, in Finland, in Sweden".

Ocasio-Cortez endorsed Bernie Sanders in the 2020 presidential election and appeared with him at speaking engagements. Campaign rallies she attended with him drew the largest crowds of any presidential rally. On January 25, she joined Michael Moore to fill in for Sanders at a rally at the University of Iowa while Sanders was attending the Senate's Trump impeachment trial.

Economic policy
Ocasio-Cortez is open to using Modern Monetary Theory (MMT), a heterodox economic theory with little support among mainstream academics, as an economic pathway to fund and enable implementation of her policy goals.

Anti-poverty
In September 2019, Ocasio-Cortez introduced an anti-poverty policy proposal (packaged in a bundle called "A Just Society") that would take into account the cost of childcare, health care, and "new necessities" like Internet access when measuring poverty. The proposal would cap annual rent increases and ensure access to social welfare programs for people with convictions and undocumented immigrants. According to the U.S. census, about 40million Americans live in poverty.

Banking
In late 2020, Ocasio-Cortez and Rashida Tlaib proposed a public banking bill to encourage creation of state and local public banks by giving them access to facilities from the Federal Reserve and setting national guidelines on public banking.

In April 2021, Ocasio-Cortez announced a bill that she and three senators had introduced to implement postal banking pilot programs in rural and low-income urban neighborhoods where millions of households cannot access or afford standard banking services.

Labor rights
Ocasio-Cortez has been a vocal supporter of labor rights, including a $15 per hour federal minimum wage. In May 2019, she returned to bartending at the Queensboro Restaurant in Jackson Heights, Queens, to promote the Raise the Wage Act, which would increase the minimum hourly wage for restaurant servers and other tipped workers from $2.13 to $15. Speaking to restaurant workers, customers and reporters, she criticized an exemption in U.S. minimum wage law for restaurants and the service sector that allows them to be paid less than $7.25 per hour, saying, "Any job that pays $2.13 per hour is not a job, it is indentured servitude."

On January 20, 2021, Ocasio-Cortez skipped the inauguration of Joe Biden in order to join the 2021 Hunts Point Produce Market strike in the Bronx.

Tax policy
Ocasio-Cortez has proposed a marginal tax as high as 70% on income above $10million to pay for the Green New Deal. According to tax experts contacted by The Washington Post, this tax would bring in extra revenue of $720billion per decade. Ocasio-Cortez has opposed and voted against the pay-as-you-go rule supported by Democratic leaders, which requires deficit-neutral fiscal policy, with all new expenditures balanced by tax increases or spending cuts. She and Representative Ro Khanna have condemned the rule for hamstringing new or expanded progressive policies. She cites Modern Monetary Theory as a justification for higher deficits to finance her agenda. Drawing a parallel with the Great Depression, she has argued that the Green New Deal needs deficit spending like the original New Deal.

Amazon HQ2 plan
Ocasio-Cortez opposed a planned deal by New York City to give Amazon.com $3 billion in state and city subsidies and tax breaks to build a secondary headquarters (Amazon HQ2) in an area near her congressional district, saying that the city should instead itself invest $3 billion in the district. Some commentators criticized her remarks on the grounds that she did not understand tax breaks are discounts on money paid to, not by, the government, that "New York does not have $3 billion in cash" it would "give" to Amazon, and that between 25,000 and 40,000 new jobs, in addition to the high-paying tech jobs Amazon would have created, disappeared when Amazon left. Conservative columnist Marc Thiessen argued that "her economic illiteracy is dangerous" because "by helping to drive Amazon away, she did not save New York $3 billion; she cost New York $27 billion."

Environment

Ocasio-Cortez has called for "more environmental hardliners in Congress", calling climate change "the single biggest national security threat for the United States and the single biggest threat to worldwide industrialized civilization". Referring to a recent United Nations report indicating that the effects of climate change could become irreversible unless carbon emissions are reined in within the next 12 years, she has argued that global warming must be addressed immediately to avert human extinction.

Ocasio-Cortez's environmental plan, the Green New Deal, advocates for the U.S. to transition to an electrical grid running on 100% renewable energy and to end the use of fossil fuels within ten years. The changes, estimated to cost roughly $2.5trillion per year, would be financed in part by higher taxes on the wealthy. She has said she has an "open mind" about nuclear power's role in the Green New Deal, but has been criticized for ignoring it in her proposals for the deal.

Foreign policy

China

Ocasio-Cortez criticized the American companies Activision Blizzard and Apple for censoring pro-democracy protesters in Hong Kong. She co-signed a letter to Activision Blizzard CEO Bobby Kotick that read, "As China amplifies its campaign of intimidation, you and your company must decide whether to look beyond the bottom line and promote American values—like freedom of speech and thought—or to give in to Beijing's demands in order to preserve market access."

A bipartisan letter by Ocasio-Cortez and seven other lawmakers fiercely criticized the NBA's handling of a controversy involving a tweet by Houston Rockets general manager Daryl Morey supporting pro-democracy protesters in Hong Kong. The lawmakers wrote that the NBA's response not only "sold out an American citizen" but also "reinforces the Chinese Communist Party view that those who point to Chinese repression in Hong Kong are as best stating opinions, not facts", as well as being "a betrayal of fundamental American values".

Iran, Saudi Arabia and Yemen
Ocasio-Cortez voted to withdraw U.S. military aid for Saudi Arabia's war in Yemen. She criticized President Trump's administration for escalating tensions with Iran, saying that it would bring the country into a "military conflict that is completely irresponsible".

Israel
In May 2018, Ocasio-Cortez criticized the Israel Defense Forces' use of deadly force against Palestinians participating in the 2018 Gaza border protests, calling it a "massacre" in a tweet. In a July 2018 interview, she said she was "a proponent of a two-state solution" and called Israel's presence in the West Bank an "occupation of Palestine". After being asked to elaborate, she responded she was not "the expert on geopolitics on this issue". Her use of the term "occupation" drew backlash from a number of pro-Israel groups and commentators. Others defended her remarks, citing the United Nations' designation of the territory in the West Bank as occupied. In July 2019, Ocasio-Cortez voted against a House resolution introduced by Representative Brad Schneider condemning the Global Boycott, Divestment, and Sanctions Movement targeting Israel. The resolution passed 398–17.

Ocasio-Cortez warned that Israel's planned annexation of Palestinian territories in the occupied West Bank "would lay the groundwork for Israel becoming an apartheid state". She wrote to U.S. Secretary of State Mike Pompeo that she would work to "pursue legislation that conditions the $3.8billion in U.S. military funding to Israel to ensure that U.S. taxpayers are not supporting annexation in any way". AIPAC condemned the letter, saying it threatened the U.S.-Israel relationship.

In May 2021, Ocasio-Cortez issued a statement condemning Israel's evictions of Palestinian families from their homes in Israeli-occupied East Jerusalem. She criticized President Biden for saying Israel "has a right to defend itself", arguing that "blanket statements like these [with] little context or acknowledgement of what precipitated this cycle of violence—namely, the expulsions of Palestinians and attacks on Al Aqsa—dehumanize Palestinians [and] imply the US will look the other way at human rights violations."

On September 23, 2021, Ocasio-Cortez abruptly changed her vote from "no" to "present" on a bill providing $1 billion for Israel's Iron Dome missile defense system, citing the "hateful targeting" she had received surrounding the bill. She apologized for her vote after receiving criticism on social media from some supporters of Israel and of Palestine, but maintained her opposition to the bill due to Israel's "persistent human rights abuses against the Palestinian people".

Syria
In 2023, Ocasio-Cortez was among 56 Democrats to vote in favor of H.Con.Res. 21, which directed President Joe Biden to remove U.S. troops from Syria within 180 days.

Governance

Judiciary
After the contentious confirmation of Supreme Court Justice Amy Coney Barrett, Ocasio-Cortez urged Democratic presidential nominee Joe Biden to expand the court if he won and their party achieved a Senate majority. In April 2021, she supported a bill to increase the Court's size. She again called for expansion in September 2021 after the Court voted not to grant an emergency stay of the Texas Heartbeat Bill.

In March 2022, Ocasio-Cortez called on Justice Clarence Thomas to resign over his wife's texts urging President Trump's chief of staff to overturn the 2020 presidential election, raising a possible impeachment effort if he did not. After the Supreme Court overturned Roe v. Wade in June 2022, Ocasio-Cortez called for the impeachment of Justices Neil Gorsuch and Brett Kavanaugh. She alleged that the two had lied under oath about their views on Roe during their confirmation hearings.

In June 2022, after the Supreme Court made several consequential rulings and granted certiorari to Moore v. Harper, which has a potential impact on future elections, Ocasio-Cortez tweeted that the U.S. was "witnessing a judicial coup in progress". The next month, she claimed the Court had "gone rogue" and that impeachment, expansion, introduction of ethics rules and recusal requirements should be considered. She added that Thomas should certainly be impeached. Two days later she led House progressives calling on the Democratic leadership in Congress to strip the Court of its jurisdiction "in the areas of abortion, marriage equality, non-procreative intimacy, and contraception". They pointed to Thomas's concurring opinion in Dobbs, which suggested revisiting cases that established a constitutional right to contraception, same-sex marriage and gay sex.

Pay raises for Congress
In 2019, Ocasio-Cortez supported pay raises for Congress. She wrote, "It's not a fun or politically popular position to take. But consistency is important. ALL workers should get cost of living increases. That's why minimum wage should be pegged to inflation, too." Members of Congress make $174,000 annually; the Speaker makes $223,500 and House leaders make $193,400. Republican Kevin McCarthy joined her in supporting the pay raise, saying he didn't want Congress to be a place where only the wealthy can afford to serve. Colleagues such as Joe Cunningham opposed the measure, saying, "We didn't come up here to give ourselves a raise".

Presidency of Donald Trump
On June 28, 2018, Ocasio-Cortez told CNN she would support the impeachment of President Trump, citing Trump's alleged violations of the Emoluments Clause and saying that "we have to hold everyone accountable and that no person is above that law."

Puerto Rico
Ocasio-Cortez has called for "solidarity with Puerto Rico". She has advocated for granting Puerto Ricans further civil rights, regardless of Puerto Rico's legal classification. She advocates for voting rights and disaster relief. Ocasio-Cortez was critical of FEMA's response to Hurricane Maria and the federal government's unwillingness to address Puerto Rico's political status. She believes the federal government should increase investment in Puerto Rico. In August 2020, Ocasio-Cortez and Nydia Velázquez introduced the Puerto Rico Self-Determination Act of 2020, which was referred to the House Committee on Natural Resources.

On March 18, 2021, Ocasio-Cortez, Velázquez and Senator Bob Menendez introduced a new version, the Puerto Rico Self-Determination Act of 2021, with over 70 co-sponsors in the House and seven co-sponsors in the Senate, including one Republican.

Healthcare
Ocasio-Cortez supports transitioning to a single-payer healthcare system and considers medical care a human right. She says that a single government health insurer should cover every American, reducing overall costs. Her campaign website says, "Almost every other developed nation in the world has universal healthcare. It's time the United States catch up to the rest of the world in ensuring all people have real healthcare coverage that doesn't break the bank." Many 2020 Democratic presidential candidates adopted the Medicare-for-all proposal.

In June 2019 and in July 2021, Ocasio-Cortez proposed legislation that would remove restrictions placed on researching the medical use of psilocybin.

Social issues

Abortion
Ocasio-Cortez supports codifying the right to abortion, and is a member of the House pro-choice caucus. On July 19, 2022, after the Supreme Court overruled Roe v. Wade in Dobbs v. Jackson Women's Health Organization, she and 17 other members of Congress were arrested in an act of civil disobedience for refusing to clear a street during a protest for reproductive rights outside the Supreme Court Building.

Education
Ocasio-Cortez campaigned in favor of establishing tuition-free public colleges and trade schools. She has said she is still paying off student loans herself and wants to cancel all student debt.

Immigration
Ocasio-Cortez has expressed support for defunding and abolishing the U.S. Immigration and Customs Enforcement (ICE) agency on multiple occasions. In February 2018 she called it "a product of the Bush-era Patriot Act suite of legislation" and "an enforcement agency that takes on more of a paramilitary tone every single day". That June, she said she would "stop short of fully disbanding the agency", and would rather "create a pathway to citizenship for more immigrants through decriminalization". She later clarified that this does not mean ceasing all deportations. Two days before the primary election, Ocasio-Cortez attended a protest at an ICE child-detention center in Tornillo, Texas. She was the only Democrat to vote against H.R. 648, a bill to fund and reopen the government, because it funded ICE.

In January 2021, Ocasio-Cortez expressed support for the Roadmap to Freedom resolution to guide future immigration policy championed by Representative Pramila Jayapal. The resolution aims to safeguard vulnerable migrants while reducing criminal prosecutions of migrants.

Detention centers for undocumented immigrants

In June 2019, Ocasio-Cortez compared the detention centers for undocumented immigrants under the Trump administration at the Mexico–United States border to "concentration camps". She cited "expert analysis", linking to an Esquire article quoting Andrea Pitzer, author of One Long Night: A Global History of Concentration Camps, who had made a similar claim. Some academics supported Ocasio-Cortez's use of the term for the forced detention of immigrants; other figures strongly criticized it, saying it showed disrespect for Holocaust victims. In response to criticism from both Republicans and Democrats, Ocasio-Cortez said they had conflated concentration camps ("the mass detention of civilians without trial") with death camps. She refused to apologize for using the term: "If that makes you uncomfortable, fight the camps, not the nomenclature."

In July 2019, Ocasio-Cortez visited migrant detention centers and other facilities in Texas as part of a congressional delegation to witness the border crisis firsthand. She described the conditions as "horrifying". She said that women in one cell said they had not had access to showers for two weeks and were told to drink water from the toilet when their sink broke, and that one woman said that her daughters had been taken from her two weeks earlier and she did not know where they were.

In February 2021, when the Biden administration reopened a Carrizo Springs, Texas, center to house unaccompanied migrant children, Ocasio-Cortez responded that such actions "never will be okay—no matter the administration or party". For short-term measures to address the situation, she called for mandatory licensing for such centers and urged reconsideration of how the centers are "contracted out".

LGBTQ equality
Ocasio-Cortez is a proponent of LGBTQ rights and LGBTQ equality. She has said she supports the LGBTQ community and thanked its members for their role in her campaign. She publicized and later appeared on a video game live stream to help raise money for Mermaids, a UK-based charity for trans children. At the January 2019 New York City Women's March in Manhattan, Ocasio-Cortez gave a detailed speech in support of measures needed to ensure LGBTQ equality in the workplace and elsewhere. She has also made a point of recognizing transgender rights, specifically saying, "It's a no-brainer... trans rights are civil rights are human rights."

At the House Committee on Oversight and Reform on February 27, 2020, Ocasio-Cortez argued for LGBTQ equality in the context of her religious background. Referencing a Catholic hospital that refused a hysterectomy for a transgender man, she argued, "[t]here is nothing holy about rejecting medical care of people, no matter who they are, on the grounds of what their identity is. There is nothing holy about turning someone away from a hospital."

Police funding
Ocasio-Cortez supports the "defund the police" movement. Asked to give her interpretation of the movement, she said, "It looks like a suburb", and "affluent white communities already live in a world where they choose to fund youth, health, housing etc more than they fund police. When a teenager or preteen does something harmful in a suburb (I say teen bc this is often where lifelong carceral cycles begin for Black and Brown communities), White communities bend over backwards to find alternatives to incarceration for their loved ones to 'protect their future,' like community service or rehab or restorative measures. Why don't we treat Black and Brown people the same way? Why doesn't the criminal system care about Black teens' futures the way they care for White teens' futures? Why doesn't the news use Black people's graduation or family photos in stories the way they do when they cover White people (eg Brock Turner) who commit harmful crimes?"

Political endorsements
In January 2020, Ocasio-Cortez announced the formation of a PAC called Courage to Change, which announced its first endorsements of progressive Democrats on February 21, 2020. Some progressive commentators subsequently criticized Ocasio-Cortez for having only endorsed two Democratic primary challengers by March 3. A notable omission was Cori Bush, who had received an endorsement from Ocasio-Cortez two years prior.

Congressional service

Electoral history

2018

2020

2022

Awards and honors
The MIT Lincoln Laboratory named the asteroid 23238 Ocasio-Cortez after her when she was a senior in high school in recognition of her second-place finish in the 2007 Intel International Science and Engineering Fair. Ocasio-Cortez was named the 2017 National Hispanic Institute Person of the Year by Ernesto Nieto. In 2019, Ocasio-Cortez received the Adelle Foley Award. She was named as one of the 2019 BBC 100 Women.

Personal life
After the death of Ocasio-Cortez's father in 2008, her mother and grandmother moved to Florida due to financial hardship. She still has family in Puerto Rico, where her grandfather was living in a nursing home before he died in the aftermath of Hurricane Maria. Ocasio-Cortez said that "to be Puerto Rican is to be the descendant of... African Moors [and] slaves, Taino Indians, Spanish colonizers, Jewish refugees, and likely others. We are all of these things and something else all at once—we are Boricua."

Ocasio-Cortez is a Catholic. She discussed her faith and its impact on her life and her campaign for criminal justice reform in an article she wrote for America, the magazine of the Jesuit order in the United States. At a December 2018 Hanukkah celebration in New York, she said she has some Sephardic Jewish ancestry.

During the 2018 election campaign, Ocasio-Cortez resided in Parkchester, Bronx, with her partner, web developer Riley Roberts. They got engaged in April 2022 in Puerto Rico.

OpenSecrets, analyzing financial disclosure forms, ranked Ocasio-Cortez one of the least wealthy members of the 116th Congress, with a maximum net worth of $30,000.

In May 2021, Ocasio-Cortez said that she has been in psychotherapy to cope with the "extraordinarily traumatizing" 2021 United States Capitol attack. She said she "did not know if [she] was going to make it to the end of that day alive".

See also
List of Hispanic and Latino Americans in the United States Congress
List of Democratic Socialists of America who have held office in the United States
Nuyorican
Puerto Ricans in New York City
Puerto Ricans in the United States
Women in the United States House of Representatives

Explanatory notes

References

Further reading

External links

Campaign website

Alexandria Ocasio-Cortez's file at Politifact

|-

|-

 
1989 births
20th-century Roman Catholics
21st-century American politicians
21st-century American women politicians
21st-century Roman Catholics
Activists from New York City
American community activists
American gun control activists
American people of Sephardic-Jewish descent
American politicians of Puerto Rican descent
American Roman Catholics
Articles containing video clips
BBC 100 Women
Boston University College of Arts and Sciences alumni
Catholic socialists
Catholics from New York (state)
Democratic Party members of the United States House of Representatives from New York (state)
Democratic Socialists of America politicians from New York
Female members of the United States House of Representatives
Hispanic and Latino American members of the United States Congress
Hispanic and Latino American women in politics
American LGBT rights activists
Left-wing populism in the United States
Living people
People from Yorktown, New York
Politicians from the Bronx
Progressivism in the United States
Puerto Rican people in New York (state) politics
Puerto Rican people of Jewish descent
Roman Catholic activists
Twitch (service) streamers
Women civil rights activists
Women in New York (state) politics